Nadigudem is a village in Suryapet district, of the Indian state of Telangana. It is located in Nadigudem mandal of Kodad revenue division.

References

Villages in Suryapet district
Mandal headquarters in Suryapet district